Rtveli is a traditional vintage and rural harvest holiday in Georgia accompanied by feasts, musical events and other celebrations. It normally takes place in late September in eastern Georgia and in mid-October in western Georgia. 

In Georgia, where wine has an iconic significance, the tradition of rtveli dates back to ancient times, having its roots in the festivity of mid-Autumn abundance and variety. Rtveli usually lasts for several days, with people starting working in early morning hours and ending the day with a feast in the accompaniment of vintage-themed folk songs.

The name "Rtveli" likely derives from the Georgian word “Stveli” meaning “fruit harvest”. The “s” was eventually replaced by “r” to more specifically refer to the grape harvest. Rtveli itself refers to the events and celebration of the harvest, and should not be confused with one specific festival or location. Families across Georgia can celebrate their own Rtveli in private or joining with friends, neighbors and guests. It is typical for extended family to return from the cities during this time, to help with the harvest The Georgian folk song Mravaljamieri may be sung by participants while the grapes from the harvest would have been crushed underfoot in the satsnikheli - a vessel made from a carved out section of a large tree trunk. In modern times, motorized wine presses are more commonly used, even at home wineries. These devices can remove the stems and they are far faster at processing grapes than traditional foot stomping, as well as being more hygienic.

See also 

 Georgian wine
 Tbilisoba

References 

Georgian wine
Festivals in Georgia (country)
Georgian words and phrases
Autumn events in Georgia (country)